Christopher Mills is an unincorporated community located within Medford Township in Burlington County, New Jersey, United States.

Christopher Mills was named for a sawmill owned by John Christopher.

References

Medford, New Jersey
Unincorporated communities in Burlington County, New Jersey
Unincorporated communities in New Jersey